The Mace-Trefethen R-2 Shark is an American single place racing aircraft designed in the 1970s.

Design and development
The R-2 is a single seat, low-wing aircraft with conventional landing gear. The wooden construction aircraft features an elliptical wing.

Operational history
At the 1970 Reno Air Races Mace achieved a speed of

Specifications (R-2 Shark)

References

Racing aircraft
Low-wing aircraft
Aircraft first flown in 1970